The Music Machine is a 1979 British musical drama film directed by Ian Sharp and starring Gerry Sundquist, Patti Boulaye and David Easter.

It was called the first all-British disco film.

Plot summary
In a north London music hall, local kids dance at the disco, where the DJ is Laurie. A contest is held by an impresario (Hector Woodville) to find two dancers to star in a film. Gerry is a club regular who lives with his mum and dad (a projectionist). Gerry wants to impress another dancer (Mandy Perryment) and winds up dancing with Claire. He is double-crossed by manager Nick Dryden.

Cast
 Gerry Sundquist ... Gerry Pearson 
 Patti Boulaye... Claire
 David Easter ... Howard 
Mandy Perryment
Hector Woodville
 Michael Feast ... Nick Dryden 
 Ferdy Mayne ... Basil Silverman 
 Clarke Peters ... Laurie 
 Richard LeParmentier ... Jay Reltano
 Johnnie Wade ... Mr. Pearson
 Gary Shail ... Aldo 
 Brenda Fricker ... Mrs. Pearson 
 Thomas Baptiste ... Claire's father
 John Gorman ... Newsagent
Christopher Pichaeli ... Dancer

Production
Director Ian Sharp was working at the BBC as a documentary filmmaker. They gave him a three-month sabbatical to make the movie, which Sharp says ignited his interest in working in drama.

The film's star Gerry Sundquist was best known for his work in the National Theatre and was cast even though he could not dance. "It all happened so quickly," he later said. "I couldn't believe it. I was a bit worried at first - it's not exactly Richard the Third is it?... It's about a boy who is really untogether at the beginning. He's got lots of energy and zitz and he wants to be the greatest in a dance competition. But he's like me - he's got two left feet."

Sunquist did intensive training to be able to dance. The film was shot over three weeks.

Reception
The Guardian said the film "limps a bit" but "does have some life about it. It isn't as atrocious as it could have been... The trouble is the dancing is actually pretty awful."

The Observer criticised the "poor music and the truly terrible dancing" but thought "several things combine to make it [the film] oddly likeable - the unglamorous view of teenage camaraderie, the unforced affection of Gerry's relationship with his parents, and some odd quirky scenes here and there."

References

External links

The Music Machine at Letterbox DVD
The Music Machine at TCMDB

1979 films
British musical drama films
Films directed by Ian Sharp
1970s musical drama films
1979 drama films
1970s English-language films
1970s British films